Sean Malone (born April 30, 1995) is an American professional ice hockey forward, currently playing with the Rochester Americans in the American Hockey League (AHL) while under contract with the Buffalo Sabres of the National Hockey League (NHL).

Playing career
After a successful career at Nichols School, where he was All-State in three sports, Malone was drafted by the Buffalo Sabres in the sixth round, 159th overall, in the 2013 NHL Entry Draft. He played college hockey for Harvard University of ECAC Hockey. During his junior and senior years at Harvard, he underwent hip surgery and rehabilitation for his injury. Despite his setbacks, he was signed to a professional contract by the Sabres on April 8, 2017, and made his NHL debut that night in a game against the Florida Panthers as an emergency replacement for Marcus Foligno. He had one shot on net and played over 12 minutes in the 3–0 loss to the Panthers.

After participating in the Buffalo Sabres development camp in July 2017, Malone was unable to participate at the Sabres' rookie camp, the Prospects Challenge tournament, and training camp due to another injury. He was then assigned to the Sabres AHL affiliate, the Rochester Americans, for the 2017–18 season.

On June 25, 2019, Malone opted to remain within the Sabres organization, signing a one-year AHL contract to continue with the Rochester Americans. In the 2019–20 season, Malone in his third season with the Americans appeared in 58 games, placing second on the team in scoring by tallying 30 points, before the season was cancelled due to the COVID-19 pandemic.

As a free agent, Malone was able to secure a NHL contract by agreeing to a one-year, two-way contract with the Nashville Predators on July 15, 2020. Malone opened the pandemic delayed  season with the Predators, registering an assist in his lone game with the club. He later re-assigned to AHL affiliate, the Chicago Wolves, for the remainder of the year.

As a free agent from the Predators, Malone opted to return to his original club, the Buffalo Sabres, agreeing to a one-year, two-way contract on July 28, 2021.

Career statistics

Regular season and playoffs

International

Awards and honors

References

External links
 

1995 births
Living people
American men's ice hockey centers
Buffalo Sabres draft picks
Buffalo Sabres players
Chicago Wolves players
Harvard Crimson men's ice hockey players
Ice hockey people from Buffalo, New York
Nashville Predators players
Rochester Americans players